Gianina Ernst (born 31 December 1998) is a German ski jumper and the youngest participant during the 2014 Winter Olympics.

Personal life 
Gianina Ernst was born in Winterthur, Switzerland, to a German-Swiss family. Her father, Joachim Ernst, was a ski jumper and German champion who, during FIS Nordic World Ski Championships 1982 in Oslo, finished 11th on the K70 hill and 38th on the K90 hill. Her mother, Cornelia Thomas, was a Swiss cross country skier, who represented Switzerland at the 1980 Winter Olympics and 1982 World Championship.

Gianina has five siblings. Her brother, Benjamin Ernst (born 21 March 1995), is also a ski jumper.

Career 
Ernst's debut in the FIS Ski Jumping World Cup took place in December 2013 in Lillehammer, where she'd already won a second place medal in a previous competition.

She was the youngest participant during the 2014 Winter Olympics when a Women's Ski Jump competition was hosted for the first time in the history of the Winter Olympic Games.

References

External links 
 
 
 

1998 births
Living people
German female ski jumpers
German people of Swiss descent
Olympic ski jumpers of Germany
Ski jumpers at the 2014 Winter Olympics
21st-century German women